M. Dayne Aldridge, Sc.D., P.E. is the former Dean of the School of Engineering at Mercer University.  Aldridge served as dean from 1999 to June 30, 2008.  He was formerly the associate dean for cross-disciplinary programs in the College of Engineering at Auburn University and served as director of the Thomas Walter Center for Technology Management.  He is a fellow of the Institute of Electrical and Electronics Engineers (IEEE) and has served as the president of the IEEE Industry Applications Society.  He graduated from West Virginia University in 1963 and received his masters' and doctorate in Electrical Engineering from the University of Virginia in 1965 and 1968.

References

External links 
 Mercer University Website
 Mercer University School of Engineering Website
 ASEE Engineering Magazine

Mercer University faculty
Year of birth missing (living people)
Auburn University faculty
West Virginia University alumni
University of Virginia School of Engineering and Applied Science alumni
Living people
Place of birth missing (living people)